Fortunato Payao (born 3 March 1940) is a Filipino gymnast. He competed in three events at the 1964 Summer Olympics.

References

1940 births
Living people
Filipino male artistic gymnasts
Olympic gymnasts of the Philippines
Gymnasts at the 1964 Summer Olympics
Place of birth missing (living people)